Anders Indset is a Norwegian philosopher, author investor and public speaker. Among the philosophical and socio-political ideas he has advanced are The Quantum Economy, Reflection on the Simulation Hypothesis, Weltbildung (a new educational narrative) and the final narcissistic injury of mankind.

Business ventures 
Indset has a background as an entrepreneur and worked for a decade as a consultant for "Hidden champions" and Forbes Global 2000 companies. He is regarded as a trusted sparring partner for international executives in business as well as leaders in society and politics. He holds various advisory board roles and is a visiting guest lecturer at leading international business schools.

With his move to Germany, he founded an advertising agency. In 2012, he founded the Global Institute of Leadership and Technology (GILT), an executive education company. Indset has served as supervisory board member of the German Tech Entrepreneurship Center (GTEC), a business incubator that promotes entrepreneurship and technology. Alongside Klaus Hommels with Lakestar, Anders Indset was one of the early investors in the Swiss deep-tech company Terra Quantum AG in 2020. Indset also sits on the Advisory Board of this company.

Indset is also a shareholder and chairman of the board of Njordis AS, a venture capital and advisory company founded in 2022, which has launched the Global Blockchain Initiative, an educational organization around blockchain technology. Early 2023 Indset together with a group of scientists, philosophers, artists and corporates launched The Quantum Economy that aims to educate and realize projects at the intersection of human beings and exponential technologies.

Writing
His first German-language book, Quantenwirtschaft (The Quantum Economy), entered the Spiegel bestseller list on #7 in May 2019. In August, it reached #1 on the monthly Manager Magazin bestseller list of best-selling business books. According to the Quantum Economy, the discoveries of Copernicus, Darwin and the unconscious in psychoanalysis by Freud described as narcissistic injuries of man, where exalted self-image was questioned with the paradigm shifts that followed. Today, this is similar to the rapid development of exponential technologies, quantum computers and artificial intelligence. This final narcissistic injury could make humans superfluous, at least rob them of their ability to shape their own destiny. With "Quantum Economy", Indset strives for a society of understanding as a way out. The questions of being human and of creation remain unanswered in it. Humanity, however, succeeds in answering the question of what future and what progress are desirable.

His book Wild Knowledge, published in English in 2017 and in German in 2019, also entered the Spiegel bestseller list at #10 in September 2019. The book was also published in Norwegian and Korean. His book ‘Das infizierte Denken’ entered the hardcover nonfiction Spiegel bestseller list at #9 in 2021. In this book, he published the philosophy of "Enkelfähig" as a new definition of the art of doing business in the 21st century, which he translated to a portmanteau ‘Prosterity’ as a reference for prosperity for posterity and a translation of the German word serving future generations. The family-owned investment holding company Haniel and its CEO Thomas Schmidt have made this philosophy the basis of their corporate activities.

In December 2022, Indset, together with Austrian Physicist Florian Neukart, Markus Pflitsch and Michael R. Perelshtein, published "Are we Living in a (Quantum) Simulation? – Constraints, observations, and experiments on the simulation hypothesis" on Philpapers that looks at ways to test Nick Bostrom's simulation hypothesis. Based on a number of observations, constraints, and the foreseeable availability of quantum computers, the authors propose experiments to test this hypothesis. These include the emergence of intelligent life and its behavior, a reversal of global entropy, a compression of dimensions, or the evolution of simulations along a simulation chain.
Indset has written a monthly column for Handelsblatt since 2018.

Bibliography
 Philosophy@Work, Unbound, London 2022,ISBN 978-1-911498-23-0. 
 Quantenwirtschaft: Was kommt nach der Digitalisierung?, Econ, Düsseldorf 2019, ISBN 978-3-430-20272-5.
 (en) The Quantum Economy. Saving the Mensch with Humanistic Capitalism, Econ, Düsseldorf 2020, ISBN 978-3-430-21050-8.
 (fr) L'économie quantique. (Re)construire le monde de demain grâce au capitalisme humaniste, Alisio, Paris 2021, ISBN 978-2-37935-146-4.
 (no): Kvanteøkonomien – humanistisk kapitalisme – menneskehetens redning, Hegnar media, 2022, ISBN 9788271464042.
 (zh): 量子经济: 如何开启后数字化时代, Machinery Industry Press, Peking 2022, ISBN 978-7-111-66531-1.
 (ko): 양자경제: 양자적 관점으로 해석하는 인공지능, 팬데믹, 기후위기 이후의 세상 / 앤더스 인셋 지음 ; 배명자 옮김, 2022, ISBN 978-89-65964-964.
 Wildes Wissen – Klarer denken als die Revolution erlaubt, Campus Verlag, Frankfurt am Main 2019, ISBN 978-3-593442402.
 (en) Wild Knowledge: Outthink the Revolution, LID Publishing, 2017, ISBN 978-1-911498-23-0.
Das infizierte Denken: Warum wir uns von alten Selbstverständlichkeiten verabschieden müssen, Econ, Düsseldorf 2021, ISBN 978-3430210546.

Awards and honors
In 2018 he was recognized by Thinkers50 on their list Radar 2018, a ranking of leading global business thinkers. Indset was subsequently named "Thinker of the Month" in July and August 2018 and nominated for the Breakthrough Idea Award in 2019 for his book The Quantum Economy.

Personal life
Indset grew up in Røros, Norway. At the age of 17, he went to the United States for a year and a half and graduated from high school there. Indset came to Germany, to learn the German language and study German philosophy. In addition to his professional activities, Indset was active in Handball as a competitive athlete and was a player on the Norwegian National Handball Team. From 2000 he played in Germany for the club HSC Bad Neustadt and from 2003 for TV Gelnhausen, including between 2003 and 2007 in the 2nd Handball Bundesliga.
Indset lives in Frankfurt am Main and is father of two daughters.

References

External links 
 
 Official event website | The Business Philosopher of Anders Indset
 Official website of Anders Indset 
 Official website of The Quantum Economy ecosystem

1978 births
Living people
Norwegian writers
21st-century Norwegian philosophers
21st-century  Norwegian  economists
Norwegian columnists
Norwegian male handball players